Endotricha loricata is a species of snout moth in the genus Endotricha. It was described by Frederic Moore, in 1888. It is found in Sri Lanka, Pakistan, India and China (Yunnan).

The wingspan is 16 mm.

References

Moths described in 1888
Endotrichini